This article provides information on candidates who ran in the 1928 Australian federal election. The election was held on 17 November 1928.

By-elections, appointments and defections

By-elections and appointments
On 6 March 1926, John Perkins (Nationalist) was elected to succeed Sir Austin Chapman (Nationalist) as the member for Eden-Monaro.
On 26 February 1927, Ted Theodore (Labor) was elected to succeed William Mahony (Labor) as the member for Dalley.
On 21 May 1927, Archdale Parkhill (Nationalist) was elected to succeed Sir Granville Ryrie (Nationalist) as the member for Warringah.
On 30 August 1927, John Verran (Nationalist) was appointed as a South Australian Senator to succeed Charles McHugh (Labor).
On 18 April 1928, Albert Robinson (Nationalist) was appointed as a South Australian Senator to succeed Sir Henry Barwell (Nationalist).
On 5 June 1928, Albert Gardiner (Labor) was appointed as a New South Wales Senator to succeed John Grant (Labor).
On 16 June 1928, Graham Pratten (Nationalist) was elected to succeed Herbert Pratten (Nationalist) as the member for Martin.
On 1 August 1928, John MacDonald (Labor) was appointed as a Queensland Senator to replace Thomas Givens (Nationalist).
On 3 September 1928, Bernard Corser (Country) was elected unopposed to succeed Edward Corser (Nationalist) as the member for Wide Bay.
On 6 September 1928, William Lambert (Labor), the member for West Sydney, died. No by-election was held due to the proximity of the election.
Subsequent to the election, but prior the new Senate taking its place:
On 18 December 1928, Richard Abbott (Country) was appointed as a Victorian Senator to replace David Andrew (Country).

Defections
In 1925, Labor Senator James Ogden (Tasmania) was expelled from the party and joined the Nationalist Party.
In 1928, Country MP Llewellyn Atkinson (Wilmot) defected to the Nationalist Party.

Seat changes
Senator Albert Gardiner (Independent Labor) contested Dalley.

Retiring Members and Senators

Labor
 Matthew Charlton MP (Hunter, NSW)

Country
 Robert Cook MP (Indi, Vic) — forgot to nominate himself, leaving his seat to the Labor candidate unopposed.
Senator David Andrew (Vic)

Independent
 William Watson MP (Fremantle, WA)

House of Representatives
Sitting members at the time of the election are shown in bold text. Successful candidates are highlighted in the relevant colour. Where there is possible confusion, an asterisk (*) is also used.

New South Wales

Northern Territory

Queensland

South Australia

Tasmania

Victoria

Western Australia

Senate
Sitting Senators are shown in bold text. Tickets that elected at least one Senator are highlighted in the relevant colour. Successful candidates are identified by an asterisk (*).

New South Wales
Three seats were up for election. The Labor Party was defending one seat. The Nationalist-Country Coalition was defending two seats. Nationalist Senators Charles Cox, Walter Duncan and Walter Massy-Greene were not up for re-election.

Queensland
Four seats were up for election. One of these was a short-term vacancy caused by Nationalist Senator Thomas Givens's death; this had been held in the interim by Labor's John MacDonald. The Nationalist Party was defending four seats. Nationalist Senators Sir William Glasgow and William Thompson were not up for re-election.

South Australia
Three seats were up for election. Originally, they were held by the Labor Party, but two Nationalist Party members had been appointed to casual vacancies. Nationalist Senators Alexander McLachlan and Sir John Newlands and Country Party Senator John Chapman were not up for re-election.

Tasmania
Three seats were up for election. The Nationalist Party was defending two seats. One seat had been held by the Labor Party, but Senator James Ogden had defected to the Nationalists. Nationalist Senators John Millen, Herbert Payne and Burford Sampson were not up for re-election.

Victoria
Three seats were up for election. The Labor Party was defending two seats. The Country Party was defending one seat. Nationalist Senators Harold Elliott, James Guthrie and William Plain were not up for re-election.

Western Australia
Three seats were up for election. The Labor Party was defending two seats. The Nationalist Party was defending one seat. Nationalist Senators Patrick Lynch and Sir George Pearce and Country Party Senator William Carroll were not up for re-election.

See also
 Members of the Australian House of Representatives, 1925–1928
 Members of the Australian House of Representatives, 1928–1929
 Members of the Australian Senate, 1926–1929
 Members of the Australian Senate, 1929–1932
 List of political parties in Australia

References
Adam Carr's Election Archive - House of Representatives 1928
Adam Carr's Election Archive - Senate 1928

1928 elections in Australia
Candidates for Australian federal elections